The Roman Catholic Diocese of Macapá is a diocese located in the city of Macapá in the Ecclesiastical province of Belém do Pará in Brazil.

History
 February 1, 1949: Established as Territorial Prelature of Macapá from the Territorial Prelature of Santarém
 October 30, 1980: Promoted as Diocese of Macapá

Leadership
 Bishops of Macapá (Roman rite)
 Bishop Pedro José Conti (2004.12.29 – present)
 Bishop Giovanni Risatti, P.I.M.E. (1993.01.20 – 2003.09.08)
 Archbishop Luiz Soares Vieira (1984.04.25 – 1991.11.13)
 Bishop José Maritano, P.I.M.E. (1980.10.30 – 1983.08.31)
 Prelates of Macapá (Roman rite) 
 Bishop José Maritano, P.I.M.E. (1965.12.29 – 1980.10.30)
 Bishop Aristide Pirovano, P.I.M.E. (1955.07.21 – 1965.03.27)
 Bishop Aristide Pirovano, P.I.M.E. (Apostolic Administrator 1950.01.14 – 1955.07.21)

Sources
 GCatholic.org
 Catholic Hierarchy

Roman Catholic dioceses in Brazil
Christian organizations established in 1949
Macapa, Roman Catholic Diocese of
Roman Catholic dioceses and prelatures established in the 20th century
1949 establishments in Brazil